Roland Cloutier (born October 6, 1957) is a Canadian former ice hockey centre who played 34 games in the National Hockey League with the Detroit Red Wings and Quebec Nordiques between 1978 and 1980. The rest of his career, which lasted from 1977 to 1988, was mainly spent in the French domestic league. After his playing career he served as a coach of the Val-d'Or Foreurs of the Quebec Major Junior Hockey League between 1996 and 2000.

Career statistics

Regular season and playoffs

External links
 

1957 births
Living people
Canadian expatriate ice hockey players in France
Canadian ice hockey centres
Detroit Red Wings draft picks
Detroit Red Wings players
Diables Noirs de Tours players
Ice hockey people from Quebec
Kansas City Red Wings players
Nova Scotia Voyageurs players
Quebec Nordiques players
Quebec Nordiques (WHA) draft picks
Rapaces de Gap players
Sportspeople from Rouyn-Noranda
Syracuse Firebirds players
Trois-Rivières Draveurs players